Travelogues of Palestine are the written descriptions of the region of Palestine by travellers, particularly prior to the 20th century. The works are important sources in the study of the history of Palestine and of Israel. Surveys of the geographical literature on Palestine were published by Edward Robinson in 1841, Titus Tobler in 1867 and subsequently by Reinhold Röhricht in 1890. Röhricht catalogued 177 works between 333—1300CE, 19 works in the 14th c., 279 works in the 15th c., 333 works in the 16th c., 390 works in the 17th c. 318 works in the 18th c., and 1,915 works in the 19th c.

In total, there are more than 3,000 books and other materials detailing accounts of the journeys of primarily European and North American travelers to Ottoman Palestine. The number of published travelogues proliferated during the 19th century, and these travelers' impressions of 19th-century Palestine have been often quoted in the history and historiography of the region, although their accuracy and impartiality has been called into question in modern times.

List of travelogues
Chronological list by years of travel, also indicating first publication, and/or edition available online.

Until the 18th century

Ottoman period, 18th century
 

 Printed for L. Davis and C. Reymers

 
 Printed for L. Davis and C. Reymers, 456 pages
 876 pages
 : together with a description of Grand Cairo and of several celebrated places in Egypt, Palestine, and Syria : to which are added, A short account of the present state of the Christians who are subjects to the Turkish government, and the journal of a gentleman who travelled from Aleppo to Bassora] ... Published by printed and sold for the author, by James Phillips: and sold also by L. Davis; Paine and Son; J. Sewell; J. Walter; and by the author, 259 pages
 

, Item notes: v. 2
 * 
: to which are annexed, observations on the plague, and on the diseases prevalent in Turkey, and a meteorological journal Printed and sold by James Humphreys, 595 pages

Ottoman period, 19th century

Arundale, Francis (1837): Illustrations of Jerusalem and Mount Sinai: Including the Most Interesting Sites Between Grand Cairo and Beirout, 116 pages

Dawson Borrer, Louis Maurice Adolphe Linant de Bellefonds (1845): A Journey from Naples to Jerusalem, by Way of Athens, Egypt, and the Peninsula of Sinai, Including a Trip to the Valley of Fayoum, 579 pages
Barclay Johnson, Sarah (1858): Hadji in Syria: Or, Three Years in Jerusalem, 295 pages
 
Bartlett, W. H. (1863): Jerusalem revisited 202 pages 
Bond, Alvan, 1793–1882; Fisk, Pliny, 1792–1825 (1828): Memoir of the Rev. Pliny Fisk, A.M. : late missionary to Palestine. 
 
volume 2
Buckingham, James Silk. (1825): Travels among the Arab Tribes Inhabiting the Countries East of Syria and Palestine.Burckhardt, John Lewis, 1784–1817 (1822): Travels in Syria and the Holy LandIsabel Burton (1875): The Inner Life of Syria, Palestine, and the Holy Land: From My Private Journal. 
Carne, John (1826): Letters from the East: Written During a Recent Tour Through Turkey, Egypt, Arabia, the Holy Land, Syria, and Greece. Vol.1; Vol.2.
Charles, Elizabeth (1862): Wanderings over Bible lands and seas. By the author of the "Schönberg-Cotta family."Chateaubriand, François-René, (1812): Travels in Greece, Palestine, Egypt, and Barbary During the Years 1806 and 1807 
Chesney, Francis Rawdon (1868): Narrative of the Euphrates expedition: carried on by order of the British government during the years 1835, 1836, and 1837 Published by Longmans, Green, and co., 564 pages
Clarke, Edward Daniel (1813): Travels in various countries of Europe, Asia and AfricaClaude Reignier Conder, see PEF Survey of Palestine.
Conder, Josiah (1824): Palestine, Or, the Holy Land: Or, The Holy Land, 372 pages
Croly, George and Roberts, David, The Holy Land, Syria, Idumea, Arabia, Egypt, and Nubia. 2 vols. London, 1842, 1849
Crosby, Howard, (1851): Lands of the Moslem: A Narrative of Oriental Travel. New York
Cuinet, Vital, (1896), Syrie, Liban et Palestine, géographie administrative, statistique, descriptive et raisonnée

Dixon, William Hepworth (1868): The Holy Land Published by J.B. Lippincott & Co., Edition: 3 Item notes: v. 1, 418 pages
Joseph Dupuis (1856): The Holy Places: A Narrative of Two Years' Residence in Jerusalem and Palestine Vol II. 
Egerton, Lady Francis (1841): Journal of a tour in the Holy Land, in May and June 1840 London.
Eugène-Melchior de Vogüé (1894). Syrie, Palestine, Mont Athos: voyage aux pays du passé. Paris: E. Plon, Nourrit et cie. 389 pages
Fabri, Felix (1848): Fratris Felicis Fabri Evagatorium in Terrae sanctae, Arabiae et Aegypti peregrinationem: 3 vol. in Latin! Vol 1. (volume 3)
Farley, James Lewis (1858): Two years in SyriaFinn, Elizabeth Anne, (1866): Home in the Holy Land: A Tale Illustrating Customs and Incidents in Modern Jerusalem., London

Fisk, George (1845): A pastor's memorial of Egypt, the Red Sea, the wildernesses of Sin and Paran, Mount Sinai, Jerusalem, and other principal localities of the Holy Land visited in 1842Forsyth, J. Bell (James Bell), 1802–1869) (1861): A Few Months in the East: Or, A Glimpse of the Red, the Dead, and the Black Seas Printed by J. Lovell, 181 pages
Fuller, John (1830): Narrative of a Tour Through Some Parts of the Turkish Empire Published by John Murray, 560 pages
Guérin, M. V. (1868): Description géographique, historique et archéologique de la Palestine. Judee Item notes
Hartwell Horne, Thomas, Contributor William Finden, Edward Francis Finden (1836):Landscape Illustrations of the Bible: Consisting of Views of the Most Remarkable Places Mentioned in the Old and New Testaments : from Original Sketches Taken on the SpotHenniker, Frederick, (1823): Notes, During a Visit to Egypt, Nubia, the Oasis, Mount Sinai, and Jerusalem, Published by J. Murray, 340 pages
Hofland (Barbara), Mrs Hofland, John Harris, John Harris (Firm) Contributor John Harris, John Harris (Firm) (1825): Alfred Campbell, the Young Pilgrim: Containing Travels in Egypt and the Holy Land Published by John Harris, corner of St. Paul's Church-Yard
Hogg, Edward (1835): Visit to Alexandria, Damascus, and Jerusalem, During the Successful Campaign of Ibrahim Pasha: During the Successful Campaign of Ibrahim Pasha, Published by Saunders and Otley, 1835 Item notes: v. 2
Hull, Edward (1885): Mount Seir, Sinai, and Western Palestine: Being a Narrative of a Scientific Expedition. Committee of the Palestine Exploration Fund.
 Index
Jaubert, Pierre-Amédée, Lapie (Pierre), Camille Alphonse Trézel (1821): Voyage en Arménie et en Perse: fait dans les années 1805 et 1806, par P. Amédée Jaubert ... Accompagné d'une carte des pays compris entre Constantinople et Téhéran, dressée par M. le chef d'escadron Lapie, suivi d'une notice sur le Ghilan et le Mazenderan, par M. le colonel Trézel ... 506 pages
(1855): Journal of a deputation sent to the East by the committee of the Malta Protestant college, in 1849: containing an account of the present state of the Oriental nations, including their religion, learning, education, customs, and occupations By Malta Protestant college Item notes: v. 1 Published by J. Nisbet and co.
Jessup, Henry Harris (1873): The Women of the Arabs. New York: Dodd and Mead
Jolliffe, Thomas Robert, Andrew Dickson White (1822): Letters from Palestine: Descriptive of a Tour Through Galilee and Judæa : to which are Added, Letters from EgyptJones, George (1836): Excursions to Cairo, Jerusalem, Damascus, and Balbec from the United States Ship Delaware, During Her Recent Cruise: With an Attempt to Discriminate Between Truth and Error in Regard to the Sacred Places of the Holy City Published by Van Nostrand and Dwight, 388 pages
Walter Keating Kelly, (1844): Syria and the Holy Land: Their Scenery and Their People. Being Incidents of History and Travel, from the Best and Most Recent Authorities, Including J. L. Burckhardt, Lord Lindsay, and Dr. Robinson 451 pages
Horatio Herbert Kitchener, see PEF Survey of Palestine.
de Lamartine, Alphonse (1838): A pilgrimage to the Holy Land: comprising recollections, sketches, and reflections, made during a tour in the east, in 1832–1833Lane, Edward William (1860): An account of the manners and customs of the modern Egyptian  Edition: 5, Published by J. Murray, 619 pages
Lees; George Robinson (1905 [1897]): Village life in Palestine: A Description of the Religion, Home, Life, Manners, Customs and Characteristics and Superstitions of the Peasants of the Holy Land with Reference to the Bible. London: Longmans, Green and Co.
 
Lindsay, Lord (1838): Letters on Egypt, Edom, and the Holy Land Published by H. Colburn, Item notes: v. 1 
Lorenzen, F N. (1859): Jerusalem, Beschreibung meiner Reise nach dem heiligen Lande, 1858 
 
Lyon, George Francis (1821): A Narrative of Travels in Northern Africa, in the Years 1818, 19, and 20: Accompanied by Geographical Notices of Soudan, and of the Course of the Niger. With a Chart of the Routes, and a Variety of Coloured Plates, Illustrative of the Costumes of the Several Natives of Northern Africa Published by John Murray, 383 pages

Madden, Richard Robert (1829): Travels in Turkey, Egypt, Nubia and Palestine in 1824, 1825, 1826 & 1827. Vol. 2
Madox, John (1834): Excursions in the Holy Land, Egypt, Nubia, Syria, &c: Including a Visit to the Unfrequented District of the Haouran Published by Richard Bentley, Item notes: v. 2 
Macmichael, William (1819): Journey from Moscow to Constantinople: In the Years 1817, 18 
Merrill, Selah (1881): East of the Jordan: A Record of Travel and Observation in the Countries of Moab, Gilead, and Bashan, Published by Bentley, 549 pages 

 
 
Mills, John, (1864): Three Months’ Residence at Nablus and an Account of the Modern Samaritans. London
Fred Arthur Neale (1851): Eight Years in Syria, Palestine, and Asia Minor, from 1842 to 1850: From 1842 to 1850 351 p. Vol I. 

Osborn, Henry Stafford (1859): Palestine, Past and Present: With Biblical, Literary, and Scientific Notices Published by J. Challen & son, 600 pages
Paxton, John D. (1839): Letters on Palestine and Egypt: Written During Two Years' Residence A.T. Skillman, 320 pages
Edward Henry Palmer, see PEF Survey of Palestine.

Pfeiffer, Ida (1843): A Visit to the Holy Land, Egypt, and ItalyPickthall, Marmaduke William, 1875–1936 (1918): Oriental Encounters Palestine and Syria, 1894–6 
Porter, Josias Leslie (1867): The Giant Cities of Bashan: And Syria's Holy Places Prime, William C. (1857): Tent life in the Holy Land. New York: Harper & Brothers, the full text, University of Michigan Library.
Ritter, Carl (1866): The Comparative Geography of Palestine and the Sinaitic Peninsula., Volume 1 (Volume 2 and Volume 3 and Volume 4)
Richardson, Robert (1822): Travels Along the Mediterranean and Parts Adjacent in Company with the Earl of Belmore, During the Years 1816–17–18: Extending as Far as the Second Cataract of the Nile, Jerusalem, Damascus, Balbec,Richter, Otto Friedrich von, Johann Philipp G. Ewers (1822): Otto Friedrichs von Richter Wallfahrten im Morganlande, aus seinen Tagebüchern und Briefen dargestellt von J.P.G. Ewers. Mit Kupfern [16 plates].

 Index p. 643
George Robinson (1837): Travels in Palestine and Syria: In Two Volumes. Only Vol 2 (?) 
Rogers, Edward Thomas (1855) Notices of the modern Samaritans: illustrated by incidents in the life of Jacob Esh Shelaby Published by S.Low, 55 pages

Scholz, Johann Martin Augustin (1822): Travels in the Countries Between Alexandria and Paraetonium, the Lybian Desert, Siwa, Egypt, Palestine, and Syria, in 1821 Translation of: Reise in die Gegend zwischen Alexandrien und Parätonium, die libysche Wüste, Siwa, Egypten, Palästina und Syrien in den Jahren 1820 und 1821. Published by R. Phillips, 120 pages

Yehoseph Schwarz, Translated by Isaac Leeser (1850): A Descriptive Geography and Brief Historical Sketch of PalestineSkinner, Thomas (1836): Adventures During a Journey Overland to India: By Way of Egypt, Syria, and the Holy Land Published by R. Bentley, Item notes: v. 2
Spilsbury, Francis B., Edward Orme (1823): Picturesque Scenery in the Holy Land and Syria: Delineated During the Campaigns of 1799 and 1800, Published by Howlett & Brimmer for G.S. Tregear, 70 pages
Stanley, Arthur Penrhyn (1857): Sinai and Palestine: In Connection with Their HistoryStanhope, Hester Lucy, Lady, 1776–1839, Charles Lewis Meryon (1845): Memoirs of the Lady Hester Stanhope: Comprising Her Opinions and Anecdotes of Some of the Most Remarkable Persons of Her Time Edition: 2 Published by H. Colburn, Item notes: v. 1 (of 3) 344 pages
Stebbing, Henry (1847): The Christian in Palestine: Or, Scenes of Sacred History, Historical and Descriptive Illustrated by William Henry Bartlett Published by G. Virtue, 1847, 234 pages
Stephens, John Lloyd, (1837): Incidents of Travel in Egypt, Arabia Petraea, and the Holy Land. Vol I +Vol II of two volumes
Taylor, Bayard 1825–1878 (1854): The Lands of the Saracen Pictures of Palestine, Asia Minor, Sicily, and Spain 
Thomas, John (1853): Travels in Egypt and Palestine 
William McClure Thomson, (1859): The Land and the Book: Or, Biblical Illustrations Drawn from the Manners and Customs, the Scenes and Scenery, of the Holy Land Illustrated, 712 p. Vol I (Volume 2)
Tobler, Titus (1867): Bibliographia geographica Palaestinae: zunächst kritische Uebersicht gedruckter und ungedruckter Beschreibungen der Reisen ins Heilige Land 265 pages

Turner, William (1820): Journal of a Tour in the LevantPublished by J. Murray, Item notes: v.2
Laura Valentine (1893): Palestine past and present, pictorial and descriptive

Walk, C B. (1828): A visit to Jerusalem and the holy places adjacentWallace, Alexander (1868): The Desert and the Holy Land Published by William Oliphant, 400 pages
 
Wilson, John (1847): The Lands of the Bible: Visited and Described in an Extensive Journey Undertaken with Special Reference to the Promotion of Biblical Research and the Advancement of the Cause of Philanthropy Published by William Whyte, Item notes: v. 1, 786 pages 
Wilson, William Rae (1823): Travels in Egypt and the Holy Land Edition: 2 Printed for Longman, Hurst, Rees, Orme, and Brown, 544 pages
Wright, T. (ed. and translated) (1848): Early Travels in Palestine: Comprising the Narratives of Arculf, Willibald, Bernard, Saewulf, Sigurd, Benjamin of Tudela, Sir John Maundeville, De la Brocquière, and Maundrell Published by Henry G. Bohn
Al-Zahiri (1894) Kitb zubdat kashf al-mamlik wa bayn al-uruq wa-al-maslikZimpel, Charles Franz (1865): Strassen-verbindung des Mittelländischen mit dem Todten Meere und Damascus über Jerusalem mit Heranziehung von Bethelehem, Hebron, Tiberias, Nazareth etc.... Published by H.L. Brönner, 47 pages

20th century
Ottoman period
Baldensperger, P. J. (1913): The Immovable East: Studies of the People and Customs of Palestine, Boston
 
Grant, Elihu (1921): The People of Palestine archive.org 
Inchbold, A C (1906): Under the Syrian sun: The Lebanon, Baalbek, Galilee, and Judaea. With 40 full-page coloured plates and 8 black-and-white drawings by Stanley Inchbold Published by Hutchinson

May, Karl Friedrich, 1842–1912, (1907/1908): Travel Tales in the Promised Land (Palestine) 
Kelman, John, John Fulleylove (1912): The Holy Land Illustrated by John Fulleylove, Published by A. & C. Black, 301 pages

British period
Livingstone, William Pringle (1923): A Galilee Doctor: Being a Sketch of the Career of Dr. D.W. Torrance of Tiberias, Published by Hodder and Stoughton, 295 pages
Ludwig Preiss, Paul Rohrbach (1926): Palestine and Transjordania Published by Macmillan, 230 pages

Debate over mid-nineteenth century depictions
During the 19th century, many residents and visitors attempted to estimate the population without recourse to official data, and came up with a large number of different values. Estimates that are reasonably reliable are only available for the final third of the century, from which period Ottoman population and taxation registers have been preserved.

Mark Twain
In Chapters 46, 39, 52 and 56 of his Innocents Abroad, American author Mark Twain wrote of his visit to Palestine in 1867: "Palestine sits in sackcloth and ashes. Over it broods the spell of a curse that has withered its fields and fettered its energies. Palestine is desolate and unlovely – Palestine is no more of this workday world. It is sacred to poetry and tradition, it is dreamland."(Chapter 56) "There was hardly a tree or a shrub anywhere. Even the olive and the cactus, those fast friends of a worthless soil, had almost deserted the country". (Chapter 52) "A desolation is here that not even imagination can grace with the pomp of life and action. We reached Tabor safely. We never saw a human being on the whole route". (Chapter 49) "There is not a solitary village throughout its whole extent – not for thirty miles in either direction. ...One may ride  hereabouts and not see ten human beings." ...these unpeopled deserts, these rusty mounds of barrenness..."(Chapter 46)

These descriptions of the often quoted non-arable areas few people would inhabit are as Twain says, "by contrast" to occasional scenes of arable land and productive agriculture: "The narrow canon in which Nablous, or Shechem, is situated, is under high cultivation, and the soil is exceedingly black and fertile. It is well watered, and its affluent vegetation gains effect by contrast with the barren hills that tower on either side"..."Sometimes, in the glens, we came upon luxuriant orchards of figs, apricots, pomegranates, and such things, but oftener the scenery was rugged, mountainous, verdureless and forbidding"..."We came finally to the noble grove of orange-trees in which the Oriental city of Jaffa lies buried"..."Small shreds and patches of it must be very beautiful in the full flush of spring, however, and all the more beautiful by contrast with the far-reaching desolation that surrounds them on every side.

Author Kathleen Christison was critical of attempts to use Twain's humorous writing as a literal description of Palestine at that time. She writes that "Twain's descriptions are high in Israeli government press handouts that present a case for Israel's redemption of a land that had previously been empty and barren. His gross characterizations of the land and the people in the time before mass Jewish immigration are also often used by US propagandists for Israel." For example, she noted that Twain described the Samaritans of Nablus at length without mentioning the much larger Arab population at all. The Arab population of Nablus at the time was about 20,000.

Bayard Taylor
In 1852 the American writer Bayard Taylor traveled across the Jezreel Valley, which he described in his 1854 book The Lands of the Saracen; or, Pictures of Palestine, Asia Minor, Sicily and Spain'' as: "... one of the richest districts in the world"..."The soil is a dark-brown loam, and, without manure, produces annually superb crops of wheat and barley."

Laurence Oliphant
Laurence Oliphant, who visited Palestine in 1887, wrote that Palestine's Valley of Esdraelon was "a huge green lake of waving wheat, with its village-crowned mounds rising from it like islands; and it presents one of the most striking pictures of luxuriant fertility which it is possible to conceive."

Ahad Ha'am
After a visit to Palestine in 1891, Ahad Ha'am wrote:

From abroad, we are accustomed to believe that Eretz Israel is presently almost totally desolate, an uncultivated desert, and that anyone wishing to buy land there can come and buy all he wants. But in truth it is not so. In the entire land, it is hard to find tillable land that is not already tilled; only sandy fields or stony hills, suitable at best for planting trees or vines and, even that after considerable work and expense in clearing and preparing them- only these remain unworked. ... Many of our people who came to buy land have been in Eretz Israel for months, and have toured its length and width, without finding what they seek.

Henry Baker Tristram
In 1856 Henry Baker Tristram said of Palestine "A few years ago the whole Ghor (Jordan Valley) was in the hands of the fellaheen, and much of it cultivated for corn. Now the whole of it is in the hands of the Bedouin, who eschew all agriculture…The same thing is now going on over the plain of Sharon where….land is going out of cultivation and whole villages rapidly disappeared….Since the year 1838, no less than twenty villages there have thus erased from the map, and the stationary population extirpated."

Interpretations
Norman Finkelstein said in an interview with Adam Horowitz in Mondoweiss about the travel accounts: "... as you can imagine you are coming from London and you are going to Palestine, Palestine looks empty. That's not surprising. You've been to the occupied territories and even now if you are traveling on roads to the West Bank, most of it looks empty and this is now, the population in the West bank is about two million. Back then the population in the whole of Palestine — meaning the West Bank, Gaza, Israel and Jordan, the whole of Palestine — the population was about 300,000. So of course it's going to look empty".

See also
 Palestine Pilgrims' Text Society
 Demographic history of Palestine
 History of Palestine
 List of travel books
 Cartography of Palestine
 Travelogues of Latin America
 List of sources for the Crusades

Secondary literature
 
 
, London, 1890.
 Uzi Baram 2002 “Seeing Differences: Travellers to Ottoman Palestine and Accounts of Diversity” Journeys: The International Journal of Travel and Travel Writing 3(2):29–49.

References

History of Palestine (region)
Palestine